Petrișor Ionuț Petrescu (born 29 June 1993) is a Romanian professional footballer who plays as a midfielder for Liga I club FC Hermannstadt, which he captains. In his career, Petrescu also played for teams such as Voința Sibiu or Academica Clinceni.

Honours
Măgura Cisnădie
Liga IV – Sibiu County: 2013–14

FC Hermannstadt
Liga III: 2016–17
Cupa României runner-up: 2017–18

References

External links
 

1993 births
Living people
Sportspeople from Sibiu
Romanian footballers
Association football midfielders
Liga I players
Liga II players
Liga III players
CSU Voința Sibiu players
FC Hermannstadt players
LPS HD Clinceni players